Zandiyeh Metro Station is a station on Shiraz Metro Line 1. The station opened on 20 April 2017. It is located along Zand Boulevard on Zand Intersection. The station serves the historical core of the city, and the various landmarks nearby. These include the city's Municipality, Courthouse, several regional headquarters of financial institutions, Arg of Karim Khan, Vakil Bazaar, Pars Museum, and many more.

References

Shiraz Metro stations
Railway stations opened in 2017